Kattassery Augustine Joseph (24 March 1912 – 3 February 1965) was an Indian classical musician and stage actor from Kerala, India. He was the father of Indian playback singer K. J. Yesudas and grandfather of singer Vijay Yesudas.

Life
He was born in a Latin Catholic family in Kochi, as the only son of Kattassery Augustine and Thresyamma, both farmers. He started training in music and acting at a very young age. He had sung many songs and acted in many plays. He married Puthanpurakkal Elizabeth in 1937, and they were blessed with seven children - five sons and two daughters - namely Pushpa (b. 1938), Yesudas (b. 1940), Antony (Nicknamed Antappan, b. 1943), Babu (b. 1945), Mani (b. 1948), Jayamma (b. 1953) and Justin (b. 1958) in chronological order. Among these siblings, Pushpa and Babu died of severe fever at a young age. He believed in Oneness among religion and there is only One Supreme God though called by different names. He has brought up Yesudas in similar school of thought. He died of a suspected heart attack aged 53 in 1965. Yesudas, his son, later said in an interview that he had faced lot of money problems during this period and when his father died, the hospital authorities told him to give Rs. 1000/-. It was the famous lyricist P. Bhaskaran who helped him during this period. He was buried according to his wish at Kochi.

Filmography

As an actor
Nallathanka (1950)
Velakkaaran (1953)

As a playback singer
 Mahesha Maayamo ... 	Nallathanka	1950	
 Sodara Bandhamathonne ... 	Nallathanka	1950	
 Manoharamee Raajyam ... 	Nallathanka	1950	
 Maanam Thanna Maariville ... 	Nallathanka	1950	
 Aanandamaanaake ... 	Nallathanka	1950	
 Paahimaam Jagadeeshwara ... 	Velakkaaran	1953	
 Aanandamennum ... 	Velakkaaran	1953

References

20th-century Indian male classical singers
1912 births
1965 deaths
Singers from Kochi
Malayalam playback singers
Indian male playback singers
Male actors in Malayalam cinema
20th-century Indian male actors